Lalgola is a railway station at Lalgola of Murshidabad district in West Bengal. This is the terminal railway station of Sealdah-Lalgola line.

History
The Ranaghat–Lalgola branch line was opened in 1905.

References

External links

Sealdah railway division
Railway stations in Murshidabad district
Kolkata Suburban Railway stations